Julián Romero de Ibarrola (Huélamo, 1518 – Felizzano, 1577) was a Spanish military commander in the 16th century. He was one of the few common soldiers in the Spanish army to reach the rank of Maestre de Campo.

Romero was born in Huélamo, Province of Cuenca (Spain). Nothing more is known about his youth. He entered the Spanish army at the age of 16, and was stationed in Flanders. By 1547 he commanded a Spanish army unit as sergeant or captain at the Battle of Pinkie, as ally of the English in their war with Scotland known as the Rough Wooing. King Henry VIII of England was so impressed by his performance, that he made him a banneret. Romero's unit was captured during the siege of Haddington at Coldingham in the spring of 1549. He was released and stationed at Cheswick in Northumberland in May 1549.  Romero fought in the Italian War of 1551–1559, where he distinguished himself in the Battle of St. Quentin (1557), for which he was made a Knight in the Order of Santiago.

In 1565 he was stationed in Sicily, but the following year, the Duke of Alba made him Maestre de campo, and he accompanied the Duke to the Low Countries to crush the Dutch Revolt. In 1568 he commanded the guard at the execution of Counts Egmont and Horn.

Romero fought in the Siege of Mons (1572), where he nearly succeeded in killing William the Silent in a daring raid against the Dutch camp. He was also present at the Massacre of Naarden and the Siege of Haarlem, where he lost an eye. In 1574, he failed to relieve Middelburg after losing the Battle of Reimerswaal, and in 1576 he was present at the Sack of Antwerp.

By the Edict of 1577, most Spanish troops were withdrawn from the Low Countries and Romero was stationed in Cremona. He died of a stroke in Felizzano near Alessandria while he was in charge of transferring Spanish troops back to the territories of the Spanish crown. He was buried in Alessandria in the church of San Giacomo della Vittoria.

After his death 

After his death, Julian Romero became in Spain a military hero who gave his life for his country.

He was painted by El Greco around 1612 and José de Cañizares dedicated a play to him (El guapo Julián Romero) in the 18th century.

References

Spanish people of the Eighty Years' War
Spanish people of the Rough Wooing
16th-century Spanish people
1518 births
1577 deaths
Knights banneret of England